Iranian Armenia (1502–1828) refers to the period of Eastern Armenia during the early-modern and late-modern era when it was part of the Iranian empire. Armenians have a history of being divided since the time of the Byzantine Empire and the Sassanid Empire, in the early 5th century. While the two sides of Armenia were sometimes reunited, this became a permanent aspect of the Armenian people. 

Following the Arab and Seljuk conquests of Armenia, the western portion, which was initially part of Byzantium, became eventually part of the Ottoman Empire, otherwise known as Ottoman Armenia, while the eastern portion became and was kept part of the Iranian Safavid Empire, Afsharid Empire and Qajar Empire, until it became part of the Russian Empire in the course of the 19th century, following the Treaty of Turkmenchay of 1828.

Safavid Empire

Due to its strategic significance, Armenia was constantly fought over and passed back and forth between the dominion of Iran and the Ottomans. At the height of the Ottoman-Persian Wars, Yerevan changed hands fourteen times between 1514 and 1736.

In 1604, Shah Abbas I pursued a scorched earth campaign against the Ottomans in the Ararat valley. The old Armenian town of Julfa in the province of Nakhichevan was taken early in the invasion.  From there, Abbas' army fanned out across the Araratian plain.  The Shah pursued a careful strategy, advancing and retreating as the occasion demanded, determined not to risk his enterprise in a direct confrontation with stronger enemy forces.

While laying siege to Kars, he learned of the approach of a large Ottoman army, commanded by Djghazadé Sinan Pasha.  The order to withdraw was given; but to deny the enemy the potential to resupply themselves from the land, he ordered the wholesale destruction of the Armenian towns and farms on the plain. As part of this, the whole population was ordered to accompany the Iranian army in its withdrawal.  Some 300,000 people were duly herded to the banks of the Araxes River. Julfa was treated as a special case; he entrusted its evacuation to a renegade Georgian prince, Hanis Thahmaz-Ghuli Bek. He told Julfa's residents that they had three days to prepare for deportation to Iran; anyone still in town after those three days would be killed. Those who attempted to resist the mass deportation were killed outright.  The Shah had previously ordered the destruction of the only bridge, and although Iranian soldiers helped the Julfaites to cross on horses and camels, the rest of the deportees had to cross on their own, so people were forced into the waters, where a great many drowned, carried away by the currents, before reaching the opposite bank.  This was only the beginning of their ordeal.  One eyewitness, Father de Guyan, describes the predicament of the refugees thus:

It was not only the winter cold that was causing torture and death to the deportees.  The greatest suffering came from hunger.  The provisions which the deportees had brought with them were soon consumed... The children were crying for food or milk, none of which existed, because the women's breasts had dried up from hunger... Many women, hungry and exhausted, would leave their famished children on the roadside, and continue their tortuous journey.  Some would go to nearby forests in search of something to eat.  Usually they would not come back.  Often those who died, served as food for the living.

Unable to maintain his army on the desolate plain, Sinan Pasha was forced to winter in Van.  Armies sent in pursuit of the Shah in 1605 were defeated, and by 1606 Abbas had regained all of the territory lost to the Turks earlier in his reign.  The scorched-earth tactic had worked, though at a terrible cost to the Armenian people.  Of the 300,000 deported, it is estimated that under half survived the march to Isfahan.  In the conquered territories, Abbas established the Erivan khanate, a Muslim principality under the dominion of the Safavid Empire. As a result of the continuous wars in the region and Shah Abbas I's deportation of much of the Armenian population from the Ararat valley and the surrounding region, in 1605 Armenians formed less than 20% of its population.

Afsharid empire

Qajar empire

Governors

Safavid 
Div Sultan Rumlu (1516–1527)
Shahqoli Soltan Ustajlu
Tokhmaq Khan Ustajlu (1568–1575) - 1st term
Abu Torab Soltan
Khalil Khan Afshar
Tokhmaq Khan Ustajlu (1578–1583) - 2nd term
Abbasqoli Khan Qajar
Safi Khan Lezgi (1666–1674)
Saru Beg
Safiqoli Khan (1674–1679)
Zal Khan
Abd al-Masud Khan
Mohammad-Ali Khan of Yerevan (?–1716)
Mohammad-Ali Khan's son (1716–?)
Kay Khosrow Khan Cherkes	
Mohammad-Qoli Khan of Yerevan (1654–1656)
Najafqoli Khan Cherkes (1656–1663)
Abbasqoli Khan
Constantine II of Kakheti (1722–?)

See also
 Russian Armenia
 Blue Mosque, Yerevan
 Abbas Mirza Mosque, Yerevan
 Shah Abbas Mosque, Yerevan
 Ottoman Armenia
 Sasanian Armenia

References

Sources
 
 
 
 
  
 

Provinces of the Safavid dynasty
Early Modern history of Armenia
Armenia–Iran relations
Iranian people of Armenian descent
Persian Armenians
Geographic history of Iran
Early Modern history of Iran